Oileán Ruaidh (pronounced "ill-lawn roo-ah") is a rock discovered on Mars in September 2010 by the Opportunity rover. It is a 45 centimeter wide dark rock that is thought to be an iron meteorite. It was given the name Oileán Ruaidh ("Red Island") after the Irish language name of Oileán Ruaidh island in County Donegal in Ireland.

See also

External links
Mars Rover Opportunity Approaching Possible Meteorite

Mars Exploration Rover mission
Meteorites found on Mars
Rocks on Mars
Iron meteorites